Mount Hypothesis is the mountain rising to 1076 m on Nordenskjöld Coast in Graham Land, Antarctica. It has precipitous and rocky north slopes, and surmounts Mundraga Bay on the east and south.

The feature is named in appreciation of the role of hypothesis in scientific research.

Location

Maps
 Antarctic Digital Database (ADD). Scale 1:250000 topographic map of Antarctica. Scientific Committee on Antarctic Research (SCAR). Since 1993, regularly upgraded and updated

Notes

References
 Mount Hypothesis. SCAR Composite Gazetteer of Antarctica
 Bulgarian Antarctic Gazetteer. Antarctic Place-names Commission. (details in Bulgarian, basic data in English)

External links
 Mount Hypothesis. Adjusted Copernix satellite image

Mountains of Graham Land
Bulgaria and the Antarctic
Nordenskjöld Coast